Isdalstø or Isdalsstø is a village in Alver Municipality in Vestland county, Norway.

The village lies along the southern end of the Radfjorden between the villages of Alversund and Knarvik.  It was a central hub for ferry traffic until the 1970s.

References

Alver (municipality)
Ferry quays in Vestland
Villages in Vestland